Geoff Dwyer is a former professional footballer who last played for Penang FA of the Malaysia Super League.

Early life
As a child, he dreamed of becoming a professional footballer.

Penang
Designing for a living in Australia, Dwyer lined up for Parramatta FC of the National Premier Leagues NSW until Malaysian club Penang offered him a contract. On the recommendations of Guinean Balla Conde, Dwyer flew to Penang, forming a partnership with captain Chee Wan Hoe on trial there. Finally, in mid January 2003, the defender officially became the property of Penang, missing the preseason quadrangular tournament in Singapore but available for the Charity Shield. Within the space of five days, Penang had three friendlies, with Dwyer scoring in a 1–1 tie with second-tier side Kelantan SKMK. In the 2003 Charity Shield, he played his first competitive match for the club versus Selangor, scoring the game's only goal.
Failure to advance in the 2003 Malaysia Cup catalyzed Penang to not extend the Australian's contract in September, with the chairman saying he was not good enough.

References

Year of birth missing (living people)
Living people
Australian soccer players
Australian expatriate soccer players
Association football defenders
Expatriate footballers in Malaysia
Malaysia Super League players
Penang F.C. players
Soccer players from Sydney